McDill is a surname. Notable people with the surname include:

Alexander S. McDill (1822–1875), U.S. Representative from Wisconsin
Allen McDill (born 1971), former left-handed specialist in Major League Baseball
Bob McDill (born 1944), American country music songwriter
James W. McDill (1834–1894), lawyer, state-court judge, Republican United States Representative and Senator
Jeff McDill (born 1956), retired Canadian professional ice hockey right winger
McDill "Huck" Boyd (1907–1987), noted small-town newspaper publisher in Phillipsburg, Kansas, United States

See also
Mcdill Elementary School or Stevens Point Area Public School District, public school district centered in Stevens Point, Wisconsin
MacDonell
MacDowell (disambiguation)
McDaniel
McDougall (disambiguation)
McDowall (disambiguation)
McDowell (disambiguation)
McDull